Adela del Carmen Graniel Campos (born 26 December 1954) is a Mexican politician from the Party of the Democratic Revolution. From 2000 to 2003 he served as Deputy of the LVIII Legislature of the Mexican Congress representing Tabasco.

References

1954 births
Living people
Politicians from Tabasco
Women members of the Chamber of Deputies (Mexico)
Party of the Democratic Revolution politicians
21st-century Mexican politicians
21st-century Mexican women politicians
Deputies of the LVIII Legislature of Mexico
Members of the Chamber of Deputies (Mexico) for Tabasco